The 2022 The Women's Cup was the second edition of The Women's Cup, a friendly invitational tournament of women's soccer matches. It was hosted at Lynn Family Stadium in Louisville, Kentucky, United States, from August 14 to 20, 2022. The field expanded from four teams in 2021 to six. OL Reign won by defeating defending champions and hosts Racing Louisville FC 2–1.

Teams

Venue

Broadcasting 
In 2022, The Women's Cup was streamed in the United States exclusively on Paramount+ in the United States, with delayed replays broadcast on CBS Sports Network. Elsewhere, it was broadcast or streamed on various services and networks:

All other regions could stream directly from the official website.

Bracket

Matches 
Visiting international clubs played each other in the quarterfinal round, with Club América and AC Milan advancing over Tottenham and Tokyo Verdy, respectively.

Quarterfinals

Semifinals

Fifth-place match

Third-place match

Championship

Goalscorers

Awards 

 Most Valuable Player:  Tziarra King, OL Reign

References

External links 
 

2022
2022 in women's association football
2022 in American women's soccer
August 2022 sports events in the United States
Sports in Louisville, Kentucky
Women's sports in Kentucky